Breivikbotn is the administrative centre of Hasvik Municipality in Troms og Finnmark county, Norway. It is an old trading post and fishing village that is located on the western end of the island of Sørøya, looking out across the Lopphavet Sea. The village lies along Norwegian County Road 822 in the central part of the municipality.

Breivikbotn Chapel is located in this village as well as much of the commercial activity in the municipality.

References

Villages in Finnmark
Populated places of Arctic Norway
Hasvik